Morton Shelley Bailey (July 3, 1855 – March 16, 1922) was an American politician who served in the Colorado Senate from the 14th district from 1891 to 1893 and as an Associate Justice of the Colorado Supreme Court from 1909 to 1922.

Born in Wellsboro, Pennsylvania, Bailey received an A.B. from Lafayette College in Pennsylvania in 1880, and was admitted to the Colorado Bar in 1882. Bailey married Lutie Wilkin in Denver in September 1888. He was a judge of the Eleventh Judicial District of Colorado from 1892 to 1908. Following Bailey's death, Governor Oliver Henry Shoup appointed former justice John C. Campbell to the seat. The Fox News political commentator Jesse Watters is a descendant through his mother, Bailey's great-granddaughter, Anne Purvis Bailey.

References

1855 births
1922 deaths
Democratic Party Colorado state senators
Justices of the Colorado Supreme Court
Lafayette College alumni